The South Atlantic League, nicknamed the SALLY League, was a Minor League Baseball league that operated in the Southern United States intermittently from 1904 to 1963. Initially Class C league, it was elevated to Class B in 1921, Class A in 1946, and Double-A in 1963. The circuit was renamed the Southern League in 1964, and the league elected to maintain a new set of records from that season onward.

History

The original South Atlantic League was founded in 1904 by Charles W. Boyer and J.B. Lucy as a Class C league. After a year of dormancy in 1918, it continued at that classification from 1919 to 1920 before being elevated to Class B in 1921. The Great Depression caused the league to shut down from 1931 to 1935, but it returned at Class B from 1936 to 1942. Three more years of dormancy occurred during World War II, but the SALLY League was revived as a Class A circuit from 1946 to 1962.

In 1963, it was reclassified as a Double-A league. The circuit reorganized as the Southern League in 1964. To distance itself from its history at lower classifications, the newly-named league elected to start with a clean slate and not maintain records prior to the 1964 season. Thusly, the 51-year history of the league was retired with the South Atlantic League name.

In 1980, the Western Carolinas League resurrected the name as it became the current South Atlantic League.

All-time teams

 Albany Babies
 Asheville Tourists
 Augusta Dollies
 Augusta Georgians
 Augusta Rams
 Augusta Tigers
 Augusta Tygers
 Augusta Tourists
 Augusta Wolves
 Augusta Yankees
 Charleston ChaSox/White Sox
 Charleston Palmettos/Pals
 Charleston Rebels
 Charleston Sea Gulls/Gulls
 Charlotte Hornets
 Chattanooga Lookouts
 Columbia Comers/Commies/Combers
 Columbia Gamecocks
 Columbia Gems
 Columbia Reds
 Columbia Senators
 Columbia Skyscrapers
 Columbus Foxes
 Columbus Pirates
 Columbus Red Birds/Cardinals
 Gastonia Combers
 Gastonia Pirates
 Greenville Spinners
 Jacksonville Braves
 Jacksonville Jays
 Jacksonville Jets
 Jacksonville Tarpons
 Jacksonville Tars
 Knoxville Appalachians
 Knoxville Smokies
 Lynchburg White Sox
 Macon Brigands
 Macon Dodgers
 Macon Highlanders
 Macon Peaches
 Montgomery Grays
 Montgomery Rebels
 Nashville Vols
 New Orleans Bucks
 New Orleans Kings
 New Orleans Jacks
 New Orleans Generals
 Portsmouth-Norfolk Tides
 Savannah Athletics
 Savannah Indians
 Savannah Pirates
 Savannah Redlegs
 Savannah Reds
 Savannah White Sox
 South Atlantic League Orphans
 Spartanburg Pioneers
 Spartanburg Spartans

Champions

League champions were determined by different means throughout the league's history. Playoffs were held in most seasons, while in others the champions were simply the regular season pennant winners.

References

 
1904 establishments in the United States
1963 disestablishments in the United States
Defunct minor baseball leagues in the United States
Sports leagues established in 1904
Sports leagues disestablished in 1963
Baseball leagues in Tennessee
Baseball leagues in Georgia (U.S. state)
Baseball leagues in South Carolina
Baseball leagues in North Carolina
Baseball leagues in Florida
Baseball leagues in Virginia
Baseball leagues in Alabama